My Coach is a series of video games released by Ubisoft for the Nintendo DS and Wii gaming systems. Pauline Jacquey, the series producer, has described the series as a tool for "developing projects that make people feel that playing games is worth their while, allowing them to spend quality time with family and friends, learn a new skill, or improve their daily lives.”

Ubisoft has released several games in the series, such as My Word Coach, a 2007 Wii and DS title meant to help people with their vocabulary and verbal communication, and My Stop Smoking Coach: Allen Carr's EasyWay, a game which many years after its 2008 release gained ground on YouTube for its oddity, with YouTubers making videos playing and making fun of the game. Two Product Managers based out of San Francisco, Chris Ferriter and Brian Cho, were credited for launching the iOS versions in 2009, which became Ubisoft's first mobile app on the iTunes App Store.

Games

References

External links

Ubisoft franchises
Video game franchises
Lists of video games by franchise